Melvinmania: The Best of the Atlantic Years 1993–1996 is an album by Melvins, which was released in 2003 through Atlantic Records (UK). Tracks 1–5 are taken from the 1993 Houdini album. Tracks 6–10 are taken from the 1994 Stoner Witch album. Tracks 11–15 are taken from the 1996 Stag album.

The liner notes are at times incorrect, for example: "... their old pal Cobain produced (...) and played drums on a number of the tracks ..." Cobain only played additional percussion on "Spread Eagle Beagle" (Houdini). This album was not sanctioned by the band.

Track listing
"Hooch" (Melvins) – 2:53
"Lizzy" (Melvins) – 4:47
"Honey Bucket" (Melvins) – 2:44
"Set Me Straight" (Melvins) – 2:27
"Pearl Bomb" (Melvins) – 2:49
"Queen" (Crover/Osborne) – 3:09
"Sweet Willy Rollbar" (Osborne) – 1:30
"Revolve" (Deutrom/Osborne) – 4:45
"Roadbull" (Crover/Deutrom/Osborne) – 3:27
"June Bug" (Deutrom/Osborne) – 2:02
"The Bit" (Crover/Osborne) – 4:45
"Bar-X-the Rocking M" (Crover/Deutrom/Osborne) – 2:25
"Tipping the Lion" (Osborne) – 3:30
"Black Bock" (Osborne) – 2:44
"Berthas" (Osborne) – 1:24

Enhanced music videos
 "Honey Bucket"
 "Revolve"
 "Bar-X-the Rocking M"

Personnel
Dale C – drums
King B – vocals, Guitar
Lorax – Bass on tracks 1–5
Mark D – Bass on tracks 6–15

References

2003 greatest hits albums
Melvins compilation albums
Atlantic Records compilation albums